Cladopus is a genus of flowering plants belonging to the family Podostemaceae.

Its native range is Tropical and Subtropical Asia to Northern Queensland.

Species:

Cladopus austrosinensis 
Cladopus doianus 
Cladopus fallax 
Cladopus fukienensis 
Cladopus hookeriana 
Cladopus javanicus 
Cladopus nymanii 
Cladopus pierrei 
Cladopus queenslandicus 
Cladopus taiensis 
Cladopus yinggelingensis

References

Podostemaceae
Malpighiales genera